The 200th Separate Motor Rifle Brigade is a military formation of the 14th Army Corps, part of the Northern Military District, based at Pechenga in Murmansk Oblast. The brigade was formed from the 131st Motor Rifle Division in 1997 and was one of the two Russian Arctic warfare brigades.

In 2014, brigade units participated in the war in Donbas.

In 2022, brigade units participated in the 2022 Russian invasion of Ukraine. Interrogations of Russian prisoners of war established that the brigade was in Ukraine and suffered heavy losses in the Battle of Kharkiv.

History

Formation 
The 200th Brigade was formed from the former 131st Motor Rifle Division in 1997. It inherited the honorifics "Pechenga Order of Kutuzov" from the division.

Transition to professional contract status was planned to finish at the end of 2006. At the beginning of April 2006, the brigade had about 700 professional personnel, practically all sergeant positions having been filled by kontraktniks ( contracted professional soldiers). More than 180 military men and women have signed contracts for service in communications, medical, and rear services subunits. The brigade had about 10 professional soldiers from other Commonwealth of Independent States members. At the beginning of 2006, during a trip to the Leningrad Military District, the 200th Brigade was visited by the Minister of Defence, Sergei Ivanov. The brigade has association links with the Norwegian 6th Division (Norway) and the Swedish Norrbottens Regiment.

It formed part of the 6th Army in the Western Military District. As of November 2011 it became the first of two new Arctic brigades of the Russian Ground Forces. The unit had some disciplinary problems in 2011. In November 2012 it became part of the Coastal Troops of the Northern Fleet.

War in Donbas 
In 2014, the brigade was involved in the war in Donbas. Elements of the brigade participated in the battle of Luhansk Airport and were spotted in the Khryashchevatoe village, a Luhansk suburb. In October 2014, Senior Lieutenant Yevgeny Trundayev, commander of the anti-tank platoon of the 1st Motorized Infantry Battalion, was killed in the clashes for 32nd checkpoint, a battle in Luhansk region. He was later awarded the title of Hero of the Russian Federation. 

The brigade has formed part of the 14th Army Corps since the corps' formation in April 2017.

In late January 2022, the brigade deployed from Pechenga, via trains over a few days, to the training area in Postoyalye Dvory, east of Kursk, to participate in what the Russian Ministry of Defence described as combat drills. By February 19th, the brigade moved to Belgorod and remained there until the eve of the invasion.

Russian invasion of Ukraine 
On 24 February, the brigade entered operations as part of the invasion of Ukraine, operating in the area near Kharkiv. Troops of the brigade were seen operating roadblocks northeast of the city. A platoon sized element was seen entering the city on MT-LB's accompanied by a T-80 tank and anti-aircraft gun. They were later destroyed by a unit of the Ukrainian 93rd Mechanized Brigade. A column of BM-21 rocket artillery vehicles were also destroyed outside the city.  Pro-Ukrainian sources reported that the commander of the brigade's 382nd Separate Rocket Artillery Battalion, LtCol Dinar Khametov, was killed during the battle. The brigade's artillery group continued to take further losses. 

By early-March, the brigade had suffered large losses and their commander, Col Denis Kurilo, was severely wounded and left the brigade. Members of the unit were seen operating in Derhachi. It is likely two battalion tactical groups and its rocket artillery battalion were rather rendered combat ineffective during this time period. Deployed troops of the brigade suffered heavy casualties near Kharkiv with more than 30 units of equipment destroyed or captured. The Governor of Murmansk Oblast regularly announced the deaths of prominent members of the brigade including Maj. Leonid Belyakov. To replace the losses the brigade suffered, a battalion tactical group consisting of reservist, coastal troops, and sailors, reportedly with little combat training, was sent to Ukraine in July. 

It is estimated that by late May 2022, the brigade suffered heavy casualties and had fewer than 900 soldiers compared with more than 1,400 at the beginning of the invasion. According to one source, as of December 2022, the brigade is visually confirmed to have lost 40% of its vehicles.

Kharkiv counteroffensive 
By September 2022, Ukraine launched its counteroffensive in Kharkiv bringing the rest of the oblast under Ukrainian control. Following the Battle of Kupiansk, units from the brigade attempted to recapture the settlement, however, they were encircled by units of Ukraine's 92nd Mechanized Brigade and forced to retreat reportedly resulting in 30 killed and 10 wounded, including a company commander.

Current structure 
The 200th Separate Motor Rifle Brigade consists of a brigade headquarters, three motor rifle battalions, one tank battalion, a brigade artillery group (coordinating two separate self-propelled howitzer battalions and one separate rocket artillery battalion), an anti-aircraft missile battalion, an anti-aircraft missile-artillery battalion, an anti-tank artillery battalion, a reconnaissance battalion, and several directly subordinated combat support and combat service support battalions and companies.

Brigade Headquarters
274th Separate Guards Engineer Battalion
293rd Electronic Warfare Company
185th Postal Service Station
Separate Reconnaissance Battalion
Separate Communications Battalion
NBC Defense Company
Medical Company
Commandant Company
Separate Material Support Battalion
Maintenance Battalion
Sniper Company
UAV Company
583rd Separate Guards Motor Rifle Battalion (MT-LB)
658th Separate Motor Rifle Battalion (MT-LB)
664th Separate Motor Rifle Battalion (MT-LB)
60th Separate Guards Tank Battalion (T-80BVM)
Brigade Artillery Group (BrAG)
Control and Reconnaissance Battery (for brigade Chief of Artillery)
416th Separate Guards Howitzer Self-Propelled Artillery Division (152mm)
471st Separate Guards Howitzer Self-Propelled Artillery Division (152mm)
382nd Separate Rocket Artillery Battalion (BM-21)
871st Separate Anti-Tank Artillery Battalion
226th Separate Anti-Aircraft Missile Battalion
246th Separate Anti-Aircraft Missile-Artillery Battalion

Equipment 
The 200th Separate Motor Rifle Brigade has the following equipment:
 41 × T-80BVM Main Battle Tanks
 36 × 2S19 Msta self-propelled howitzers
 18 × BM-21 Grad Multiple Rocket Launchers
 MT-LB based 9P149 tank destroyers with 9K114 Shturm Anti-tank missile
 SA-13 Gopher
 Rapira 100-MM AT gun
 SA-8 Gecko
 Barnaul-T air defence system
 SA-19 Grison

Commanders 
 Colonel Vitaly Leonidovich Razgonov (September 2009April 2011)
 Colonel Denis Kurilo (2022)

References 

Mechanised infantry brigades of Russia
Military units and formations established in 1997
Military units and formations of Russia in the war in Donbas
Murmansk Oblast